Autoroute 50 (Autoroute de l'Outaouais) is an Autoroute in western Quebec, Canada. It links Canada's National Capital Region (Gatineau) and the Greater Montreal area (Mirabel).

Until November 2012, there were two distinct sections of A-50: one section running eastward from Hull and the other westward from Mirabel. The gap in the highway was filled on November 26, 2012, and the two-lane freeway opened for traffic on the full  length.

The route provides an east-west freeway alternative to Route 148 that does not require travelling in Ontario, unlike the main Trans-Canada Highway route (A-40 / Hwy 417).

History
Oswald Parent (a Liberal MP from Hull) originally proposed construction of the A-50 in 1962. Eight years later, Quebec Premier Jean-Jacques Bertrand announced plans for construction. It was originally envisioned that the A-50 would extend over 400 km from L'Isle-aux-Allumettes at the Ontario border through Saint-Jérôme and Joliette along the Route 148 and 158 corridors to Berthierville and a junction with the A-40. The primary purpose of the A-50 was to connect Ottawa and the Outaouais with Montréal–Mirabel International Airport.

At the time, the Ottawa Macdonald–Cartier International Airport was not yet built, and the national capital lacked highway access to an international air hub. Mirabel's rapid decline as an air hub as well as the Quebec government's decision in the 1970s to impose a moratorium on new autoroute construction resulted in a significantly truncated route for the A-50. Plans for extending the A-50 west of Hull and east of the A-15/TCH were abandoned. The exit numbers, however, are based on that original projected length of the autoroute.

Construction was completed in the fall of 2007 on the road that connects Highway 148 west of the Aylmer and Hull sectors to the A-50 at the Boulevard des Allumettières interchange.

One short section of Route 158 around Joliette was originally signed as A-50 as well until the project was abandoned. In addition, west of the current terminus, a four-lane at-grade expressway continues as Route 148 into the Aylmer section of Gatineau; it may become part of A-50 in the future.

A-50 is a four- to six-lane freeway through Gatineau up to Buckingham, the remainder is mostly a two-lane freeway.  Many overpasses are built to accommodate a fully divided, four-lane highway in the future such that only one portion of the overpass is currently used.  However, there have been demands for a four-lane highway for the new segment so it can be safer. The first two segments were built with only two lanes and a 2007 multi-fatality accident occurred on highway 148 near Buckingham, a section of highway that A-50 would bypass.

Unusual for a limited-access highway, the A-50 contains two railway crossings at grade, both of the Quebec Gatineau Railway (QGRY).

There has been some support to rename the highway Autoroute Maurice-Richard after historic Montreal Canadiens hockey player Maurice Richard, but the Commission de toponymie du Québec chose to wait until the section between Buckingham and Notre-Dame-de-Bonsecours was finished before making a decision, and to date no renaming has happened.

In 2022, following the death of Montreal Canadiens hockey legend Guy Lafleur (who was a native of Thurso), the Quebec government openly considered renaming the highway after Lafleur following a request made by the Minister Responsible for the Outaouais Region Mathieu Lacombe and by Thurso mayor Benoit Lauzon.

Safety improvements
Following a series of fatal collisions in 2007, it was announced that centreline rumble strips would be installed in various no-passing zones along Autoroute 50. This is the first installation of its kind in Quebec and serves as a pilot project.

The two at-grade intersections at km 281 and 283 were removed in 2016.

Exit list
Note: exit numbers in parentheses are unsigned.

References

External links 

 Transports Quebec Autoroute 50 Project Description and Timeline (in French)
 Transports Quebec Outaouais Projects Description and Timeline (in French)
 A-50 at motorways-exits.com
 A-50 at Quebec Autoroutes
 Transports Quebec Map 

 Transports Quebec Map 

50
Proposed roads in Canada